2001–02 Pirveli Liga was the 13th season of the Georgian Pirveli Liga.

First round

Table

Results

Second round

Championship group

Relegation group

See also
2001–02 Umaglesi Liga
2001–02 Georgian Cup

External links
Georgia 2001/02 RSSSF

Erovnuli Liga 2 seasons
2001–02 in Georgian football
Georgia